Guttal  is a village in the southern state of Karnataka, India. It is located in the Haveri taluk of Haveri district in Karnataka. Its around 26 km from Ranebennur

Demographics
 India census, Guttal had a population of 13198 with 6828 males and 6370 females.

See also
 Haveri
 Ranebennur
 Districts of Karnataka

References

External links
 http://Haveri.nic.in/

Villages in Haveri district